Two ships of the British Royal Navy have been named HMS Wivern after the wivern of legend:

 , launched in 1863, was an early turret ship originally constructed for the Confederate States of America, taken into the Royal Navy after her launch. She served until 1898.
 ,  launched in 1919, was a W-class destroyer. She served as a convoy escort in World War II and was broken up in 1948.

Royal Navy ship names